Ludlow Creek is a stream in the U.S. state of Ohio.

Ludlow Creek was named for a government surveyor, Israel Ludlow.

See also
List of rivers of Ohio

References

Rivers of Darke County, Ohio
Rivers of Miami County, Ohio
Rivers of Ohio